Waverley/Lake William Water Aerodrome  was located adjacent to Waverley, Nova Scotia, Canada. The airport was listed as abandoned in the 15 March 2007 Canada Flight Supplement.

References

Defunct seaplane bases in Nova Scotia